Ahmed Shawqi (also written Ahmed Chawki; , , ; ; 1868–1932), nicknamed the Prince of Poets ( Amīr al-Shu‘arā’), was an Egyptian poet laureate of Circassian-Kurdish origin, to the Arabic literary tradition.

Life
Raised in a wealthy family of mixed Circassian, Turkish, Kurdish, and Greek roots, his family was prominent and well-connected with the court of the Khedive of Egypt. Upon graduating from high school, he attended law school, obtaining a degree in translation. Shawqi was then offered a job in the court of the Khedive Abbas II, who was the khedive of Egypt, which he immediately accepted.

After a year working in the court of the Khedive, Shawqi was sent to continue his studies in Law at the Universities of Montpellier and Paris for three years. While in France, he was heavily influenced by the works of French playwrights, most notably Molière and Racine. He returned to Egypt in 1894, and remained a prominent member of Arab literary culture until the British forced him into exile in southern Spain, Andalusia, in 1914.
Shawqi remained there until 1920, when he returned to Egypt. In 1927 he was crowned by his peers Amir al-Sho’araa’ (literally, "the Prince of Poets") in recognition of his considerable contributions to the literary field.

He used to live in ‘Karmet Ibn Hani’ or Ibn Hani’s Vineyard at Al-Matariyyah area near the palace of the Khedive Abbas II at Saray El-Qobba until he was exiled. After returning to Egypt he built a new house at Giza which he named the new Karmet Ibn Hani. He met Mohammed Abdel Wahab, and introduced him for the first time to art, making him his protégé as he gave him a suite in his house. The house later on became Ahmed Shawki Museum and Mohammed Abdel Wahab became one of the most famous Egyptian composers.

Work

Shawqi’s work can be categorized into three main periods during his career. The first coincides with the period during which he occupied a position at the court of the Khedive, consisting of eulogies to the Khedive: praising him or supporting his policy. The second comprised the period of his exile in Spain. During this period, his feeling of nostalgia and sense of alienation directed his poetic talent to patriotic poems on Egypt as well as the Arab world and panarabism. The third stage occurred after his return from exile, during that period he became preoccupied with the glorious history of Ancient Egypt and Islam. This was the period during which he wrote his religious poems, in praise of the Islamic prophet Muhammad. The maturation of his poetic style was also reflected in his plays, the most notable of which were published during this period.

Plays
Shawqi was the first in modern Arabic literature to write poetic plays. He wrote five tragedies:
 Majnun Laila (literally "The Mad about Layla"), his first play.
 The Death of Cleopatra
 'Antara
 Ali beh el-Kebeer
 Kambeez (Cambyses II), 1931

and two comedies:
 El-Set Huda (Madame Huda)
 El-Bakhila (the Miser-ette)

in addition to a prose play: the Princess of Andalusia.

Poetry
 Esh-Shawqiyyat, his selected works, in four volumes, including Nahj al-Burda, a tribute to Muhammad.
 The States of Arabs and the Great Men of Islam, A long poem about the History of Islam.
 Poetic Stories for Children, inspired by the famous French fabulist Jean de La Fontaine.

Prose
He also wrote chapters of prose, collected under the title The Markets of Gold.

Legacy
Karmat Ibn Hani', Ahmed Shawqi's home in Giza, was converted into the Ahmed Shawki Museum on 17 June 1977.

Shawqi's work is regularly celebrated at the El Sawy Culture Wheel, a cultural center in Cairo.

The web search engine company Google uploaded a Google Doodle, a limited-time variant of their logo, to memorialize Shawki in advance of what would have been his 142nd birthday on 16 October 2010. The art featured a quote from Shawki's poetry in place of the "oo" in the Google logo, which in English translates to:

My homeland is always in my mind even if I were in paradise.

There are two roads named for Ahmed Shawqi in Giza: Ahmed Shawqi Street, where the Ahmed Shawki Museum is located; and Ahmed Shawqi Corridor. A number of statues have been created in the likeness of Shawki, including one on Dokki Street in Giza and another at the Villa Borghese in Rome.

Shawqi's granddaughter Ikbal El-Alailly was a central figure in Egypt's surrealist poetry movement. His other granddaughter Khadiga Riad was an abstract, surrealist painter. An Egyptian postage stamp was issued in honour of Shawqi on 14 October 1957 to commemorate 25 years since his death. Many books have been written on the life of Ahmed Shawqi.

References

Further reading 
Glimpses of Ahmed Shawqi’s Life and Works, Egypt Magazine, Issue No. 19-Fall 1999.

External links

 Ahmed Shawqi Museum in Cairo. 
 Monument to Shawqi in Villa Borghese, Rome.

1868 births
1932 deaths
Egyptian expatriates in France
Egyptian expatriates in Spain
20th-century Egyptian poets
Egyptian dramatists and playwrights
Place of birth missing
Linguists from Egypt
Egyptian translators
Egyptian people of Greek descent
Egyptian people of Circassian descent
Egyptian people of Kurdish descent
Egyptian people of Turkish descent
Egyptian pashas
Egyptian male poets
20th-century male writers